Lee Hye-sung (born November 26, 1992) is a South Korean television personality. She was formerly an announcer under KBS from October 2016 to May 2020. Lee then signed with SM Culture & Contents on September 18, 2020.

Personal life
Lee was in a relationship with Jun Hyun-moo, a former announcer turned broadcast personality and host. The news was revealed through Jun's (and currently Lee's) agency SM Culture & Contents on November 12, 2019. On February 22, 2022 SM Culture & Contents have confirmed that the two have broken up.

Filmography

Television shows

Web shows

Radio Show

Awards and nominations

Notes

References

South Korean television presenters
South Korean women television presenters
1992 births
People from Goyang
Living people
South Korean announcers
South Korean television personalities
Seoul National University alumni